Herman Willie Heard Jr. (born November 24, 1961) is a former professional American football running back in the National Football League (NFL). He played for the Kansas City Chiefs Kansas City Chiefs for six seasons. Heard was a third round pick by the Chiefs out of Colorado State University Pueblo. He played all of his NFL seasons in KC, garnering 13 rushing TDs and nearly 2,700 yards rushing in his career.

1961 births
Living people
Players of American football from Denver
American football running backs
Kansas City Chiefs players
CSU Pueblo ThunderWolves football players